Michael Cartwright (born 1946) is an English former professional footballer who played as a full back.

Career
Born in Birmingham, Cartwright played for Coventry City, Notts County, Bradford City and Dover.

He played for Bradford City between November 1967 and January 1968, making 1 appearance in the Football League.

Sources

References

1946 births
Living people
English footballers
Coventry City F.C. players
Notts County F.C. players
Bradford City A.F.C. players
Dover F.C. players
English Football League players
Association football fullbacks